The 2017 Mikhail Voronin Cup took place on December 19–20 in Moscow, Russia.

Medal winners

Senior

Junior

References

Voronin Cup
2017 in gymnastics
2017 in Russian sport
Sports competitions in Moscow
2017 in Moscow
December 2017 sports events in Russia